The 2014 UCI Women's Road Rankings is an overview of the UCI Women's Road Rankings, based upon the results in all UCI-sanctioned races of the 2014 women's road cycling season.

Summary

Final ranking.

Individual World Ranking (top 100)
Final ranking 2014

UCI Teams Ranking
Final ranking of the 2014 UCI women's teams.

Nations Ranking 
Final ranking 2014

References

2014 in women's road cycling
UCI Women's Road World Rankings